808: The Music is the soundtrack and remix album that accompanies the 2015 documentary film, 808, which documents the history and popular culture of the Roland TR-808. It was released on November 25, 2016, by Big Beat Records and Atlantic Records.

It was promoted with a promotional single: "Nothing but Trouble" by American rapper Lil Wayne and American singer Charlie Puth, and was released on June 30, 2015.

History 
Alongside the announcement of the documentary film, 808, in October 2014, a soundtrack accompaniment was also announced, in which Big Beat Records and Atlantic Records would distribute the label. On June 30, 2015, Lil Wayne and Charlie Puth announced and released "Nothing but Trouble", a promotional single for the film on Big Beat and Atlantic. The album was then released on November 25, 2016.

Track listing

Charts

References

External links 

2016 soundtrack albums
2016 remix albums
Big Beat Records (American record label) albums
Atlantic Records soundtracks
Electronic soundtracks